Ceranova is a comune (municipality) in the Province of Pavia in the Italian region Lombardy, located about 25 km south of Milan and about 11 km northeast of Pavia.

Ceranova borders the following municipalities: Bornasco, Lardirago, Marzano, Vidigulfo.

References

Cities and towns in Lombardy